Comer Lane Cox (May 9, 1905 – August, 1971) was an American Negro league outfielder in 1930 and 1931.

A native of Athens, Alabama, Cox attended Sumner High School in St. Louis, Missouri, and Fisk University. He spent two seasons in the Negro leagues, playing for the Nashville Elite Giants in 1930, and the Cleveland Cubs in 1931. After his baseball career, Cox settled in Springfield, Illinois, where he became the director of the Springfield Urban League. He died in Springfield in 1971 at age 66, and in 1976, the city's Comer Cox Park was named in his memory.

References

External links
 and Seamheads

1905 births
1971 deaths
Nashville Elite Giants players
Cleveland Cubs players
20th-century African-American sportspeople
Baseball outfielders